William John Foster (born 3 February 1934) is a Scottish former first-class cricketer and Royal Marines officer.

Foster was born at Glasgow and was educated in England at Harrow School. He was commissioned into the Royal Marines as a second lieutenant in November 1952. He was made an acting lieutenant in April 1954, with promotion to the full rank of lieutenant in May 1956. He was promoted to the rank of captain in January 1964. Foster made two appearances in first-class cricket for the Combined Services cricket team in 1964, playing against Cambridge University at Uxbridge, and Oxford University at Aldershot. He scored a total of 79 runs in his two matches, with a high score of 36.

References

External links

1934 births
Living people
Military personnel from Glasgow
Cricketers from Glasgow
People educated at Harrow School
Royal Marines officers
Scottish cricketers
Combined Services cricketers
20th-century Royal Marines personnel